Broadway and 42nd Street is a 1902 painting by Childe Hassam which is part of the collection of the Metropolitan Museum of Art.

Done in oil on canvas, the cityscape painting depicts the area around Times Square (then known as Longacre Square) in New York City at the intersection of Broadway and 42nd Street.

A winter scene in the evening gloom, Hassam portrays the busy cross-streets with atmospheric effect highlighted by the glow of electric light from the then new trolley cars.

The work is on view in the Met museum's Gallery 774.

References

1902 paintings
Paintings in the collection of the Metropolitan Museum of Art
Paintings by Childe Hassam